Cushenberry is a surname. Notable people with the surname include:

 Lloyd Cushenberry (born 1997), American football center